Forever Jones (usually stylized as forever JONES) is a Christian gospel group formed by husband and wife Dewitt and Kim Jones and their five children.

Band history

Husband and wife Dewitt and Kim Jones grew up in Washington and came from musical backgrounds in their families. They had been writing songs since the 90s. Dewitt enjoyed some success as a songwriter when singer Ron Kenoly recorded Dewitt's song "Use Me" for the 1994 album God Is Able. The song has since become a staple in many churches and has been covered several times, most notably by the Grammy-winning Brooklyn Tabernacle Choir.

Dewitt says that God gave him a "specific call" one time to start the group. Forever Jones was then formed with their five children: D'Jeniele, Dewitt, Judah, Dominique, and Mya Joy Grace. The Jones family's manager and friend was singer/producer Jeoffrey Benward. He then introduced them to writer/producer Tommy Sims, who agreed to produce their debut album. The album Get Ready was released on 2010 receiving favorable critics.

In 2011, the band received three Dove Award nominations for New Artist of the Year, Contemporary Gospel Album of the Year, and Contemporary Recorded Song of the Year at the 42nd GMA Dove Awards. They were also nominated for two Grammy Awards at the 53rd Grammy Awards: Best Contemporary R&B Gospel Album and Best Gospel Performance.

Dewitt and Kim Jones pastor together over King's Chapel Dallas, an extension of King's Cathedral and Chapels based in Kahului, Hawaii.

Judah Jones was a wide receiver and running back for Bill Snyder's Kansas State Wildcats, and listed as a redshirt freshman in 2014.  In his first game on August 30, 2014, he recorded 2 rushes for 24 yards and one punt return for 26 yards.

Band members

Dewitt Jones III
Kim Jones
D'Jeniele' Hooten
Dewitt Jones IV
Judah Jones
Dominique Jones
Mya Joy Grace Jones

Discography

Get Ready (2010)
Musical Revival (2012)
Prayer Tools, Vol. 1 (2014)

Awards

GMA Dove Awards

Grammy Awards

References

External list

American Christian musical groups
Family musical groups